Waldemar Levy Cardoso (December 4, 1900 – May 13, 2009) was the last living Marshal of the Brazilian Army.

Biography
Cardoso was of Jewish Algerian-Moroccan descent and was born on Rua Evaristo da Veiga in Rio de Janeiro.

He graduated from military college at the top of his class in late-1918 (making him a World War I-era veteran although he never saw combat). In 1924, he took part in the uprising against the Brazilian Federal Government and also fought in the Brazilian Revolution of 1930.

During World War II, Cardoso – at this time a lieutenant colonel – commanded an artillery battalion with the Brazilian Expeditionary Force. During the Allies' Italian campaign, he was mentioned in dispatches in World War II.

He converted to Catholicism in 1953. Between 1953 and 1954, he was the commander of the 2nd Artillery Regiment, in Itu, São Paulo.

Cardoso  was promoted to Field Marshal upon his retirement in 1966. After his retirement, he acted as president of Petrobrás between March–October 1969, acting as company's counselor between 1971 and 1985. He lived on Rua Tonelero in the Copacabana district of Rio de Janeiro.

In 2007, at the age of 107 years, he returned to Itu to see the party of the ninetieth anniversary of the 2nd Light Artillery Group, the actual designation of the old Regiment he had commanded. He died in the Hospital Central do Exército on 13 May 2009. Upon his death, he was the last Brazilian Field Marshal, the oldest World War II veteran and the last surviving World War I veteran from Brazil.

Decorations
During his career, Cardoso was awarded with several decorations, including the:
Brazil
 Combat Cross Second Class
 Brazilian Expeditionary Force Campaign Cross
 Order of Military Merit
 Military Medal in Gold with Platinum bar (for 40 years of active duty)
 Brazilian War Medal
United States
  Bronze Star
Italy
 Croce Al Valore Militare
France
 Croix de Guerre avec Palme

See also
List of centenarians
List of last surviving World War I veterans by country

References

1900 births
2009 deaths
People from Rio de Janeiro (city)
Brazilian centenarians
Brazilian Roman Catholics
Brazilian military personnel of World War II
Recipients of the Order of Military Merit (Brazil)
Brazilian Sephardi Jews
Brazilian people of Algerian-Jewish descent
Brazilian people of Moroccan-Jewish descent
Converts to Roman Catholicism from Judaism
Marshals of Brazil
Men centenarians
Jewish military personnel
Brazilian rebels